MuLab is a digital audio workstation application for macOS (OS X) and Windows platforms.

It is developed and maintained by a small company (MuTools, Belgium) led by  Jo Langie, a pioneer in sequencer technology since early Atari microcomputers.

While the main MuLab target is electronic music, it can be also used for other musical genres.
It may be also of interest for educational purposes to people learning digital audio processing.

Features 
MuLab has most of the features of a standard full DAW: audio/MIDI recording, MIDI sequencing, mixing, automation, control surface interaction, multi-core, stock synths, samplers and effects, multi-projects and templates, etc.

MuLab has an internal architecture built around a modular system (Mux) enabling customized instruments and effects by drawing graphs of modules.

MuLab is also an open environment supporting existing VST plugins.

See also
Comparison of digital audio editors
Comparison of MIDI editors and sequencers
List of music software
Multitrack recording
Music sequencer
Music Workstation

References 
 "The 20 best DAW software apps in the world today", MusicRadar, 2015.
 "Review of Mulab 6 DAW", Andrulian's blog, 2015.

External links 
 MuTools, official website.

Music sequencers
Digital audio workstation software